Michael Scanlon is a former communications director and public relations executive who has pleaded guilty to corruption charges.

Michael Scanlon may also refer to:

 Michael Scanlon (baseball) (1843–1929), baseball manager

See also
 Michael Scanlan (disambiguation)